The Boise State Broncos men's basketball statistical leaders are individual statistical leaders of the Boise State Broncos men's basketball program in various categories, including points, assists, blocks, rebounds, and steals. Within those areas, the lists identify single-game, single-season, and career leaders. The Broncos represent Boise State University in the NCAA's Mountain West Conference.

Boise State began competing in intercollegiate basketball in 1968.

The NCAA did not officially record assists as a stat until the 1983–84 season, and blocks and steals until the 1985–86 season, but Boise State's record books includes players in these stats before these seasons. These lists are updated through the end of the 2021–22 season.

Scoring

Rebounds

Assists

Steals

Blocks

References

Boise State men's basketball leaders

Lists of college basketball statistical leaders by team